Carlos Alberto Carvalho da Silva Júnior (born 15 August 1995), simply known as Carlos, is a Brazilian footballer who plays as a forward for Al-Shabab in Saudi Arabia.

Club career
Born in Santa Luz, Bahia, Carlos joined Atlético Mineiro's youth setup in 2009, aged 14. On 10 August 2013 he made his professional debut, replacing Rosinei in a 0–0 away draw against Náutico for the Série A championship.

In January 2014 Carlos was definitely promoted to the main squad. He scored his first goal on 1 March, netting the last of a 4–1 Campeonato Mineiro away routing over Villa Nova.

Carlos also appeared regularly during the year's national league, scoring a brace in a 3–2 away win against fierce rivals Cruzeiro on 21 September.

On 2 February 2017, Carlos joined Internacional on a season-long loan.

On 17 April 2018, Carlos was once again loaned by Atlético, this time to Paraná, reuniting with his former manager at Atlético's youth team Rogério Micale.

On 29 December 2018 it was announced, that Carlos had signed with Vitória F.C. in Portugal. His contract with Atlético was terminated, but the club maintained a percentage in case of future sale of the player. Carlos moved to Setúbal, but the transfer was actually never finalized due to bureaucratic problems. He then signed with another Portuguese club, Rio Ave FC.

On 20 August 2021, Carlos joined Al-Shabab on a three-year contract.

Career statistics

International career
On 27 November 2014, Carlos was preselected by the Brazil under-20s for the 2015 South American Youth Football Championship, hosted in Uruguay.

Honours
Atlético Mineiro
Copa do Brasil: 2014
Campeonato Mineiro: 2015

Individual
Primeira Liga Team of the Year: 2020–21
King Cup Top goalscorer: 2021–22

References

External links
Atlético official profile 

Profile at Rio Ave FC

1995 births
Living people
Sportspeople from Bahia
Brazilian footballers
Association football forwards
Campeonato Brasileiro Série A players
Campeonato Brasileiro Série B players
Clube Atlético Mineiro players
Sport Club Internacional players
Paraná Clube players
Rio Ave F.C. players
C.D. Santa Clara players
Al-Shabab FC (Riyadh) players
Primeira Liga players
Saudi Professional League players
Brazil youth international footballers
Brazilian expatriate footballers
Expatriate footballers in Portugal
Expatriate footballers in Saudi Arabia
Brazilian expatriate sportspeople in Saudi Arabia